Seattle Sounders FC is a Major League Soccer team.

Seattle Sounders may also refer to:

Seattle Sounders (1974–1983), a defunct North American Soccer League team
Seattle Sounders (1994–2008), a defunct USL First Division team
Sound FC (women), a current Women's Premier Soccer League team formerly known as Seattle Sounders Women (2001–2019)
Sound FC (men), a current USL League Two team formerly known as Seattle Sounders FC U-23 (2012–2019)
Tacoma Defiance, a current USL Championship team formerly known as Seattle Sounders FC 2 (2015–2018)

See also
Seattle Sounders FC Academy (2010–present), the U-18, U-16, and U-14 teams of Seattle Sounders FC
Puget Sound
Sounder (disambiguation)
Seattle (disambiguation)